Michael Schwartz is an American former ice hockey player and coach who was the NCAA Division III coach of the year.

Career
Schwartz began attending college at the University of Wisconsin–River Falls right after graduating from Johnson High School in 1975. After two years, however, he left school. In 1979 he returned to the college ranks, this time at Augsburg College. After settling in, he began to play hockey again and was part of the Auggies 1982 Championship team.

Schwartz graduated with a BA in education in 1983 and embarked on a professional career. In 1986 he returned to ice hockey once more as the head coach for his alma mater, Johnson High School. He helped the team win back-to-back twin cities championships in '89 and '90 and was hired by the Sioux City Musketeers as head coach. Schwartz did not see much success in the USHL and was fired after just one season with the Musketeers finishing last in the league. After working as an NHL scout for a year, Schwartz was back behind the bench, this time for White Bear Lake High School. His second turn in high school just as good as the first and he led the White Bears to three consecutive state tournament appearances.

In 1996, Ed Saugestad retired from coaching after 38 years with Augsburg. Schwartz was chosen as his successor and he got off to a good start with a winning season in his first year. For an encore, He led Augsburg to its first conference title in 16 years and the program's first every MIAC Tournament championship (the tournament began in 1986). Despite the NCAA not using automatic qualifiers at the time, the Auggies were also able to make their second NCAA Tournament appearance (the first in 14 years). Augsburg finished 4th in the tournament after taking down Wisconsin–River Falls in the quarterfinals and Schwartz was named as the Division III coach of the year.

The team declined sharply the following year, but Schwartz was able to rebuild the Auggies into a contender in the MIAC. After 2003, however, the program sank out of the playoff picture. In spite of the diminishing returns on the ice, Schwartz was named as the school's director of athletic facilities and helped with major extensions and renovations to several structures on campus, including the Si Melby Hall and Edor Nelson Field. He remained as the facilities director even after resigning as head coach in 2006. Two years later, however, Schwartz left Augsburg to pursue a career in the financial sector.

Schwartz was inducted into the Minnesota Hockey Coaches Association Hall of Fame in 2019.

Statistics

Regular season and playoffs

Head coaching record

USHL

College

References

External links

Year of birth missing (living people)
American ice hockey coaches
American men's ice hockey players
Living people
Ice hockey people from Minnesota
Augsburg Auggies men's ice hockey players
Augsburg Auggies men's ice hockey coaches